D.A.R.Y.L. is a 1985 science fiction film written by David Ambrose, Allan Scott, and Jeffrey Ellis. It was directed by Simon Wincer and stars Barret Oliver, Mary Beth Hurt, Michael McKean, Danny Corkill, and Josef Sommer. D.A.R.Y.L. was released in the United States on June 14, 1985 and released in Singapore on May 5, 1986. The original music score was composed by Marvin Hamlisch.

Plot 

"Daryl" (whose name is an acronym for "Data-Analyzing Robot Youth Lifeform") (Barret Oliver) is an experiment in artificial intelligence, created by a government company called TASCOM. Although physically indistinguishable from an ordinary ten-year-old boy, his brain is actually a super-sophisticated microcomputer with several unique capabilities. These include exceptional reflexes, superhuman multitasking ability, and the ability to "hack" other computer systems. The D.A.R.Y.L. experiment was funded by the military, with the intention of producing a "super-soldier".

One of the original scientists, Dr. Mulligan, has misgivings about the experiment and frees Daryl. Pursued by a helicopter, Dr. Mulligan drops off Daryl in a mountain forest in South Carolina, and tries to escape from the helicopter. The chase ends when Dr. Mulligan drives his car off a cliff and dies.

Daryl is found by an elderly couple and taken to an orphanage in the fictional town of Barkenton, South Carolina; he does not remember who or what he is. Though a normal pre-adolescent boy in most respects, Daryl begins to exhibit extraordinary talents after he goes to live with his new foster parents Joyce (Mary Beth Hurt) and Andy Richardson (Michael McKean). He is also introduced to the neighbors of the Richardsons: Howie (Steve Ryan) and Elaine Fox (Colleen Camp) and their children Sherie (Amy Linker) and Tyler "Turtle" (Danny Corkill). Due to being raised in isolation, Daryl's social skills are rather limited, but Turtle, a sarcastic, foul-mouthed wisecracker, manages to help him develop such skills.

Turtle wonders how Daryl can remember his name and how to read, but does not remember anything else about himself. Daryl tells him that he was diagnosed with amnesia, and that his real parents might pick him up one day. At Turtle's house, Daryl notices Turtle playing Pole Position, and decides to try it out, playing and reacting faster than humanly possible.

Andy decides to teach Daryl how to improve his social skills by teaching him how to play baseball, to which Daryl shows uncanny abilities, including hitting multiple home runs; one of them shatters a window. When Andy shows Daryl how to use an ATM, Daryl helps Andy to rectify a problem when it won't accept his credit card. Daryl then makes a transaction with the ATM, which results in Daryl withdrawing $100 from Andy's account, but then manipulates the ATM to show $1,426,372 in the account.

The baseball game starts with Andy's team, the Mohawks, facing the Warriors, coached by Andy's rival, Bull MacKenzie (Hardy Rawls). Daryl shows off his impressive ability, and the Mohawks start winning the game, but Turtle — who had noticed that Joyce is slightly annoyed that she cannot do anything for Daryl, because Daryl can look after himself perfectly — tells him that it is all right for him to not always be perfect and to mess up sometimes; Daryl ends up striking out his next turn, so Turtle ends up taking over for Daryl as the cleanup hitter. Turtle manages to hit a home run, winning the game for the team, and everyone is joyous over the Mohawks' victory.

However, just as the Richardsons have truly begun to form a bond with Daryl, their new-found happiness is shattered when government agents find him and return him to the TASCOM facility in Washington, D.C. where he was created. Once there, his memory is restored and he is debriefed on the lessons he learned during his time with the Richardsons. Notable items in the debriefing include his decision to strike out at a baseball game, because sub-optimal performance in some areas can be more beneficial when building relationships with others, as well as his subjective preference for chocolate-flavored ice cream over vanilla-flavored ice cream. Because Daryl has revealed a capacity for human emotions, including fear, the D.A.R.Y.L. experiment is considered a failure by the military and the decision is made that the project be "terminated".

Dr. Jeffrey Stewart (Josef Sommer), one of Daryl's designers, decides to free Daryl so he can return to the Richardson family. Unfortunately, despite the cooperation of Dr. Ellen Lamb (Kathryn Walker) — who was originally skeptical about Daryl's humanity and had alerted the military to Daryl's continued existence — they do not get away cleanly. When asked by the military to justify her complicity, Dr. Lamb offers a reformulation of the Turing test: "General, a machine becomes human ... when you can't tell the difference anymore," implying that she is no longer certain that Daryl is not human.

Daryl and Dr. Stewart manage to escape the first wave of pursuers, thanks to Daryl's advanced driving skills, apparently acquired through playing the Pole Position video game. As the sun comes up, they drive into the Northern Virginia countryside and steal a pickup truck to avoid being recognized. However, when passing two police roadblocks, Dr. Stewart is mortally wounded by a police officer's shotgun. With his dying words, he assures Daryl that he is indeed a real person and Daryl continues his escape.

That night, Daryl sneaks into a nearby USAF airbase, hacks into a computer to trigger several faraway alarms as a distraction, and steals a Lockheed SR-71 Blackbird. Daryl sets a course for Barkenton, and contacts Turtle telling him and Sherie to meet up with him at Blue Lake, a lake where he and Turtle had been before.

Because their missiles cannot intercept the plane, the Air Force tells Daryl that the plane will be vaporized mid-flight using a self-destruct mechanism. Daryl ejects at the last moment to fake his own death, as the plane is blown apart over Barkenton. In the meantime, Turtle and Sherie bike to the lake to meet up with Daryl. Unfortunately, the ejection had knocked Daryl unconscious, and he plummets into Blue Lake in his ejection seat with a deployed parachute. The added weight of both the seat and the parachute causes him to sink and Daryl drowns. When his body resurfaces, Daryl is rushed to the hospital, but shows no signs of life and is officially declared dead.

Everyone is depressed over Daryl's death, even though Turtle says that since he is a computer, he can't die. In the hospital, Dr. Lamb finds him and reactivates his electronic brain, restoring him to life. Now that he is declared dead, Daryl is no longer on the run from TASCOM and is free to return to his foster family. As Turtle walks out of the Richardsons' house, he sees Daryl running back to the house, and they joyfully reunite with everyone.

Cast 
 Barret Oliver as D.A.R.Y.L.
 Mary Beth Hurt as Joyce Richardson
 Michael McKean as Andy Richardson
 Danny Corkill as Tyler "Turtle" Fox
 Josef Sommer as Dr. Jeffrey Stewart
 David Wohl as Mr. Nesbitt
 Colleen Camp as Elaine Fox
 Steve Ryan as Howie Fox
 Amy Linker as Sherie Lee Fox
 Kathryn Walker as Dr. Ellen Lamb
 Hardy Rawls as Bull McKenzie
 Jim Fitzpatrick as TASCOM Security Cop

Production

Filming 
Filming took place from January to March 1985.

The movie was filmed at Pinewood Studios; Orlando, Florida; and Dillsboro, North Carolina.

Almost all of Barkenton was filmed in Orlando, and the surrounding areas, with one exception in Dillsboro.

 Daryl's house was filmed at 716 Euclid Avenue in Orlando.
 Turtle's house was filmed at 717 Euclid Avenue in Orlando.
 Barkenton's city hall was filmed at 50 Front Street in Dillsboro.
 The hospital scenes were filmed at Orlando VA Medical Center.
 Blue Lake was filmed at Lake Copeland in Orlando.
 The baseball game at Barkenton Park was filmed at Delaney Park in Orlando.
 Barkenton School was filmed at Kaley School in Orlando.
 Group home is filled at Great Oaks Village, boys dorm east side.

The other locations in the movie were also filmed in Orlando.

 The exterior of the TASCOM facility was filmed at the Siemens Energy Inc. building in Orlando; The interiors were filmed at Pinewood Studios.
 Daryl's escape onto the freeway was filmed on FL-408 and US-17 in Orlando.
 The airport scenes were filmed at Kissimmee Gateway Airport in Kissimmee.

Reception 
D.A.R.Y.L. failed to make it into the box office top five, and has received mixed reviews. On Rotten Tomatoes the film has 53% approval rating based on 17 reviews. A 1985 reviewer for The New York Times wrote, "The best that can be said about D.A.R.Y.L.... is that it's inoffensive." In his review for Entertainment Tonight, Leonard Maltin said, "This is one of the blandest movies I've seen all year. No punch. No surprises. No juice, especially in the way it's directed." On their show At the Movies, Gene Siskel gave D.A.R.Y.L. a "thumbs down" for being predictable and formulaic, while Roger Ebert recommended the movie, praising its ending and comparing its theme to that of the 1968 film Charly.

DVD Verdict cites "wooden" acting and a "preposterous" plot, but ultimately concludes that the film is "a formulaic slice of family entertainment that doesn't do much new, but follows the blueprint well enough to warrant a look."

See also
Cocoon (film)

References

External links 
 
 

1985 films
1980s science fiction action films
American science fiction action films
Android (robot) films
British science fiction action films
1980s English-language films
Films scored by Marvin Hamlisch
Films directed by Simon Wincer
Films set in South Carolina
Films set in Washington, D.C.
Films set in Virginia
Films shot in Florida
Films shot in North Carolina
Films shot in England
Films shot at Pinewood Studios
Films shot in France
Paramount Pictures films
Columbia Pictures films
1980s American films
1980s British films